Newton Ground is a settlement in the far north of the island of Saint Kitts in Saint Kitts and Nevis. It is located inland from the coast, to the north of Sandy Point Town, on the main road to Dieppe Bay Town.

Populated places in Saint Kitts and Nevis